Robin Yalçın (born 25 January 1994) is a German professional footballer who plays as a defensive midfielder for Turkish club Sivasspor.

Club career
On 25 September 2012, Yalçın made his debut for VfB Stuttgart II in the 3. Liga against Hansa Rostock.

Yalçın made his Bundesliga debut for VfB Stuttgart on 9 February 2014 against FC Augsburg. In March 2014 Yalçın signed a professional contract until June 2016 with VfB Stuttgart.

For the 2015–16 season Yalçın moved to Çaykur Rizespor.

After terminating his contract with Çaykur Rizespor, he joined Süper Lig side Yeni Malatyaspor on 10 January 2019.

On 28 August 2020, Yalçın joined Sivasspor for free, on a one-year deal.

On 20 June 2022, Yalçın returned to Sivasspor after one year in Germany.

International career
Yalçın made his first appearance for the Germany national under-15 team on 21 May 2009 against the USA. With the Germany national under-17 team he became vice-champion of the 2011 European U-17 Championship and won the bronze medal in the 2011 FIFA U-17 World Cup.

Personal life
Yalçın's father Barbaros Yalçın is the manager of SpVgg Grün-Weiss Deggendorf, and is of Turkish descent.

References

External links
 Robin Yalçın at fifa.com
 Robin Yalçın at uefa.com
 Robin Yalçın at VfB-Stuttgart.de 
 
 

1994 births
Living people
German footballers
German people of Turkish descent
People from Deggendorf
Sportspeople from Lower Bavaria
Association football midfielders
VfB Stuttgart II players
VfB Stuttgart players
Çaykur Rizespor footballers
Yeni Malatyaspor footballers
Sivasspor footballers
SC Paderborn 07 players
Germany youth international footballers
Footballers from Bavaria
3. Liga players
Bundesliga players
Süper Lig players
TFF First League players